Döwlet Baýramow (born 8 August 1985) is a Turkmenistani footballer who plays as a midfielder for Merw Mary.

International career
He is a member of the Turkmenistan national football team.

External links

1985 births
Living people
Turkmenistan footballers
Turkmenistan international footballers
Association football midfielders